Boulenger's bow-fingered gecko (Cyrtodactylus loriae) is a species of gecko, a lizard in the family Gekkonidae. The species is endemic to Papua New Guinea.

Etymology
The specific name, loriae, is in honor of Italian ethnologist Lamberto Loria.

Habitat

Reproduction
C. loriae is oviparous.

References

Further reading
Boulenger GA (1897). "An account of the Reptiles and Batrachians collected by Dr. L. Loria in British New Guinea". Annali del Museo Civico di Storia Naturale di Genova, Serie Seconda 18 (38): 694-710 + Plates VI-VIII. (Gymnodactylus loriae, new species, pp. 695–696 + Plate VI, figures a-d).
de Rooij N (1915). The Reptiles of the Indo-Australian Archipelago. I. Lacertilia, Chelonia, Emydosauria. Leiden: E.J. Brill. xiv + 384 pp. (Gymnodactylus loriae, p. 16).
Rösler H (2000). "Kommentierte Liste der rezent, subrezent und fossil bekannten Geckotaxa (Reptilia: Gekkonomorpha)". Gekkota 2: 28–153. (Cyrtodactylus loriae, p. 66). (in German).

Cyrtodactylus
Reptiles described in 1897